Funky Town is an album by blues guitarist and vocalist T-Bone Walker, released by the BluesWay label in 1968.

Critical reception
The Encyclopedia of Popular Music wrote that the album "showcased a virtually undiminished talent, still capable of incisive playing."

Track listing
All compositions by T-Bone Walker except where noted
 "Goin' to Funky Town" – 5:02
 "Party Girl" (Walker, E.J. White) – 3:04
 "Why My Baby (Keep On Bothering Me)" – 2:53
 "Jealous Woman" – 3:16
 "Going to Build Me a Playhouse" (Walker, White) – 3:42
 "Long Skirt Baby Blues" – 2:31
 "Struggling Blues" (Walker, Grover McDaniel) – 3:50
 "I'm in an Awful Mood" (Walker, McDaniel) – 4:19
 "I Wish My Baby (Would Come Home At Night)" – 3:00

Personnel
T-Bone Walker – guitar, vocals
Other musicians unidentified

References

T-Bone Walker albums
1968 albums
BluesWay Records albums
Albums produced by Bob Thiele